The 2010 Dwars door Vlaanderen was the 65th edition of the Dwars door Vlaanderen cycle race and was held on 24 March 2010. The race started in Roeselare and finished in Waregem. The race was won by Matti Breschel.

General classification

References

2010
2010 in road cycling
2010 in Belgian sport
March 2010 sports events in Europe